The tau emerald (Hemicordulia tau) is a species of dragonfly in the family Corduliidae. Corduliidae is the only family not a clade within the Infraorder Anisoptera. The species was first described by Edmond de Sélys Longchamps in 1871.

Description

Adult 
The tau emerald is a medium-sized, black and yellow dragonfly with long legs,
reaching a body length of about 50 mm. As is unique to dragonfly and mayfly species, H. tau has flight muscles attached directly to the wings, and in both the males and females the inboard edge of the hindwing is rounded. The 7th abdominal tergum is extensively black above and yellowish at the sides. The top of the frons are yellow with a dark T-mark. The species exhibits a linear relationship between head width and body length. 

Nearly all of the dragonfly’s head is eye, allowing incredible vision that encompasses almost every angle except right behind them. H. tau has a particularly large and well developed compound eye with two principal regions, the dorsal eye and the ventral eye. The dorsal eye is principally sensitive to short wavelength light, while the ventral eye has 3 or more spectral types of photoreceptors.

Larval Stages 
The length of time each larval stage of H. tau requires can decrease as the temperature of the water it inhabits increases. It is capable of completing its life cycle from egg to adult in less than 6 weeks. Nymphs reach a total length of 22–24 mm. No mid-dorsal abdominal spines are present unlike other Hemicordulia, but humps may be present on segments 4–9 and the lateral spines are very small. The nymphs have a ladle-shaped labium with premental and palpal setae, and well-developed palpal dentations bearing groups of setae. The prementum has a distinct ventro-basal midline/groove. 

An analysis of head width frequencies of samples from Lake Eucumbene suggest there is at least 9 instars in the life history of H. tau, however the number of larval instars is known to vary between, and within, Odonata species.

Ecology 
H. tau is found in all parts of Australia except northern Queensland and north-western Western Australia and is one of Australia's most abundant dragonflies. It is considered a dry-country dragon fly, often inhabiting the arid Australian inland. The adults are vagrants and highly opportunistic users of habitat for breeding. 

In addition to rivers, lakes and swamps H. tau has the ability to breed in temporary waters due to its short larval stages. Nymph have a high thermal growth coefficient and details of its life history may vary with their location. The nymph are able to tolerate the high temperatures found in temporary shallow ponds. The ability of H. tau to utilize temporary waters and reduce its larval life with increase in temperature contribute to its abundance and wide distribution. They are also able to overwinter in cold permanent refuges, and have been observed in water with a salinity between 7.8g/L to 13.9g/L.

H. tau larva, similar to other Odonata species, are associated with clean water and it has been suggested they could be monitored to detect changes in water quality. Larval habitat is typically leaf litter and weeds. Many aquatic invertebrates with terrestrial adult stages require a snag extending above the water surface for emergence to the adult stage.

Predators primarily include fish and birds.

Conservation Status 
The tau emerald is listed as least concern under the International Union for Conservation of Nature and Natural Resources (IUCN) red list of threatened species. Population trend is classified as unknown and no conservation actions are recommended.

Gallery

References

Corduliidae
Insects of Australia
Endemic fauna of Australia
Insects described in 1871